Sokolsko may refer to:
 Sokólsko, Poland
 Sokolsko, Kardzhali Province in Kardzhali Municipality, Bulgaria